Neocherentes dilloniorum is a species of beetle in the family Cerambycidae, and the only species in the genus Neocherentes. It was described by Tippmann in 1960.

References

Onciderini
Beetles described in 1960